"Trouble Trouble Trouble Trouble" is a dance song by Irish Australian four piece band the Potbelleez, released as the third single from their self-titled debut album The Potbelleez.

Music video 

The music video starts off with Ilan Kidron waking up after a party. As he strolls through the house, flashbacks occur and the night retraces itself. As he walks into the cellar he finds a woman dressed in a police uniform. The night rewinds and it is revealed Ilan was a police officer checking on the party who was then seduced by the woman.
The video closes with Ilan strolling over to his patrol car.

Track listing 

Digital download
"Trouble Trouble" (radio edit) - 3:29
"Trouble Trouble" - 5:54
"Trouble Trouble" (Carl Kennedy vocal mix) - 7:37
"Trouble Trouble" (Carl Kennedy club mix) - 8:11

Charts 

The single debuted on the ARIA Singles Chart at number 77 on 3 November 2008, and reached its peak of 54 on 1 December.

The Goodwill remix charted on the ARIA Club Chart.

Release history

References

2008 singles
2008 songs
Song articles with missing songwriters